White Sulphur Springs is an unincorporated community in Hall County, in the U.S. state of Georgia.

History
The community was named for a mineral spa located at the town site. A variant name is "White Sulphur Spring".

White Sulphur Springs was formerly an incorporated municipality. The town's municipal charter was repealed in 1995.

References

Former municipalities in Georgia (U.S. state)
Unincorporated communities in Georgia (U.S. state)
Unincorporated communities in Hall County, Georgia
Populated places disestablished in 1995